Markus Daun (born 10 September 1980) is a German former professional footballer who played as a striker, spending seven seasons in the Bundesliga with Bayer 04 Leverkusen, SV Werder Bremen, 1. FC Nürnberg and MSV Duisburg. He finished his career playing for Alemannia Aachen.

Honours
Werder Bremen
 Bundesliga: 2003–04
 DFB-Pokal: 2003–04

References

External links
 Profile at DFB.de
 
 
 Markus Daun at Leverkusen who's who

1980 births
Living people
People from Eschweiler
Sportspeople from Cologne (region)
Association football forwards
German footballers
Footballers from North Rhine-Westphalia
Germany under-21 international footballers
Germany B international footballers
Bundesliga players
2. Bundesliga players
Bayer 04 Leverkusen players
Bayer 04 Leverkusen II players
Alemannia Aachen players
SV Werder Bremen players
1. FC Nürnberg players
MSV Duisburg players